Félix De Jesus Jorge Estevez (born January 2, 1994) is a Dominican former professional baseball pitcher. He has played in Major League Baseball (MLB) for the Minnesota Twins.

Career

Minnesota Twins
Jorge signed with the Minnesota Twins as an international free agent in February 2011. He made his professional debut that season with the Dominican Summer League Twins. He pitched 2012 with the Gulf Coast Twins, 2013 with the Elizabethton Twins, 2014 with Elizabethton and Cedar Rapids Kernals and 2015 with Cedar Rapids. Jorge pitched 2016 with the Fort Myers Miracle and Chattanooga Lookouts. The Twins added him to their 40-man roster after the season. He was designated for assignment on June 29, 2018, and was released by the organization on July 4. He resigned a minor league deal the next day but became a free agent after the 2018 season.

Cincinnati Reds
On January 10, 2019, the Cincinnati Reds signed Jorge to a minor league deal with an invite to Spring Training. Jorge was released by the Reds on March 10, 2020.

References

External links

1994 births
Living people
Cedar Rapids Kernels players
Chattanooga Lookouts players
Dominican Republic expatriate baseball players in the United States
Dominican Summer League Twins players
Elizabethton Twins players
Fort Myers Miracle players
Gulf Coast Twins players

Major League Baseball players from the Dominican Republic
Major League Baseball pitchers
Minnesota Twins players
Rochester Red Wings players